The Cat in the Hat is a 1957 book by Dr. Seuss.

The Cat in the Hat may also refer to:

The Cat in the Hat (TV special), a 1971 animated musical adaptation
The Cat in the Hat (film), a 2003 adaptation
The Cat in the Hat (video game), a 2003 platformer based on the film
Cat in the Hat (album), by Little Benny & the Masters, 1987
Cat in the Hat, a 1980 album by Bobby Caldwell

See also
The Cat in the Hat Comes Back, a 1958 sequel to the 1957 book
The Cat in the Hat Knows a Lot About That!, a 2010 animated television series